Amrit, the classical Marathus (Marathos), was a Phoenician port located near present-day Tartus in Syria. Founded in the third millenniumBC, Marat was the northernmost important city of ancient Phoenicia and a rival of nearby Arwad. During the 2ndcenturyBC, Amrit was defeated and its site largely abandoned, leaving its ruins well preserved and without extensive remodeling by later generations.

History 
Two rivers cross the city: Nahr Amrit, near the main temple, and Nahr al-Kuble near the secondary temple, a fact that might be linked to the importance of water in the religious traditions in Amrit. The city was probably founded by the Arvadites, and served as their continental base. It grew to be one of the wealthiest towns in the dominion of Arwad. The city surrendered, along with Arwad, to Alexander the Great in 333 BC. During Seleucid times the town, known as Marathus, was probably larger and more prosperous than Arwad. In 219 BC Amrit gained independence from Arwad, and was later sacked by forces from the latter city in 148 BC.

Excavation 
Excavations of the site principally began in 1860 by Ernest Renan. Excavations were again carried out in 1954 by French archaeologist Maurice Dunand. Ceramic ware finds at Amrit indicated the site had been inhabited as early as the third millennium BC. Middle and Late Bronze Age "silo tombs" were also excavated, with contents ranging from weapons to original human remains. Excavations at the necropolis south of the town yielded several tomb structures. The funeral art found in some tombs with pyramidal-or cube-shaped towers, is considered some of "the most notable grave-monuments of the Phoenician world."

Temples 
One of the most important excavations at Amrit was the Phoenician temple, commonly referred to the "ma'abed," dedicated to the god Melqart of Tyre and Eshmun. In the center of the court a well-preserved cube-shaped cella stands. The open-air courtyard was filled with the waters of a local, traditionally sacred spring, a unique feature of this site. The temple—which was dated to the late 4th century BC, a period following the Persian expansion into Syria—shows major Achaemenid influence in its layout and decoration. According to Dutch archaeologist, Peter Akkermans, the temple is the "best-preserved monumental structure from the Phoenician homeland."

A second temple, described by visitors to the site in 1743 and 1860 and thought to have disappeared, was later discovered by the Syrian archaeological mission near the Nahr al-Kuble spring.

Stadium 

It is separated from the other two archaeological sites by the Nahr al-Amrit and a site called by the locals al-Meqla '(the quarry'). The Stadium of Amrit was first described in 1745 by Richard Pococke in Part 2 of his book, A Description of the East, and Some Other Countries, as the site where an ancient Circus was held. Ernest Renan examined it in 1860 and discussed it in his book Mission de Phénicie, making the conclusion that the complex was not Roman in its entirety and that the stadium was undoubtedly Phoenician. The stadium is about 225 to 230 meters long and 30 to 40 meters wide, it has similar dimensions to the stadium of Olympia in Greece (213 × 31/32 meters). Seven rows of seats have been partially preserved. The stadium was open to the west and had two entrances on the east side between seats. In addition, there was a tunnel to the interior. The stadium is located approximately at a right angle to the main temple of Amrit, the Maabed. The temples to the north and west have open sides or which the stadium forms a common intersection. It is believed that the  Amrit stadium was the location for sacred competitions where anointing and funeral games took place. Labib Boutros, former director of athletics at the American University of Beirut has conducted recent studies of the stadium and suggested that its construction may date back as far as 1500 BC, saying that the Amrit stadium was "devoted to sports in Phoenicia several centuries before the Olympic Games".

Necropolis 

At its base are three cylindrical parts whose diameters decrease and terminate in a dome. At the lower cylinder, to the corners of the square base plates, four lions decorate the building, which may not have been completed. Excavations of the burial chambers east of the towers has uncovered finds dated back as far as the 5th century BC. Plain limestone and clay sarcophagus were found arranged in cassette-like formation within the chambers. Other tombs are located south of the Nahr al-Qubli, the "al-Burǧ Bazzāq" or Worm tower, a phenomenal structure that was originally 19.50 meters high and the Hypogeum "Ḥaǧar al-Ḥublā" with three burial chambers, which were still used in Roman times.

Conservation 
Amrit was included on the 2004 and 2006 World Monuments Fund watch lists of endangered archaeological sites. The Fund called attention to the site's rapid deterioration due to vandalism and encroaching development. In 2006 a three-day workshop was organized with participation from the UNESCO, Directorate-General of Antiquities and Museums of Syria and local administrators responsible for the sites of Amrit, Tartus and Arwad.

Gallery

References

Citations

Bibliography
 .

External links and references 

The ancient city of Amrit (Arabic)
Pictures of the temple and stadium
Photos of Amrit at the American Center of Research

Phoenician cities
Aramean cities
Former populated places in Syria
Phoenician temples
Bronze Age sites in Syria
Archaeological sites in Tartus Governorate
Phoenician funerary practices